Juliano Haus Belletti (born 20 June 1976) is a Brazilian football coach and former player who mostly played as a right back. He is the current head coach of São Paulo's under-20 team.

Belletti began his career in the Campeonato Brasileiro Série A with Cruzeiro, São Paulo and Atlético Mineiro, being awarded the Silver Ball by Placar for his performances on loan at the last of those clubs during the 1999 season. From 2002 to 2010 he played in Europe with Villarreal, Barcelona and Chelsea, winning numerous honours; his only goal for Barcelona won them the UEFA Champions League in 2006. He then returned to Brazil, winning the national league with Fluminense in 2010.

He earned 23 caps for Brazil from 2001 to 2005, scoring once. He was part of their teams that won the 2002 FIFA World Cup and competed at the 2001 Copa América and 2003 FIFA Confederations Cup.

Early and personal life
Belletti was born in Cascavel, Paraná. He is of Italian ancestry and his family has its origins in Longiano in the Province of Forlì-Cesena, and he holds an Italian passport. He also has origins in Bastiglia in the Province of Modena and Mantua.

Club career

Early career
Belletti started his career playing as a central midfielder in Brazil for the youth team of Cruzeiro in 1992. His professional debut happened in November 1994. In March 1996, he was involved in a deal that sent him and Serginho to São Paulo FC in exchange for five players: Aílton, Donizete, Gilmar, Palhinha and Vítor. Playing for São Paulo, he eventually became a right-back.

In 1999, he was loaned to Atlético Mineiro. Playing as an attacking-midfielder, Belletti helped the club to finish second in the Brazilian League and managed to win the Bola de Prata ("Silver Ball"), an award handed by Placar magazine to the players nominated to the Brazilian League Squad of the Year.

After returning to São Paulo, he became a regular in the Brazil national team by playing in the right-back position once again.

Villarreal
In June 2002, prior to winning the World Cup with Brazil, Belletti moved to Spanish La Liga club Villarreal on a five-year deal for an estimated fee of US$3 million. He made his debut on 21 July in a 2–0 loss at Torino in the UEFA Intertoto Cup first round, playing the final 21 minutes in place of Jorge López.

Belletti was part of the squad that won the 2003 UEFA Intertoto Cup against Dutch club Heerenveen. On 15 February 2004, he scored twice at home to Racing Santander in a 6–3 victory.

Barcelona
In May 2004, Belletti transferred to Barcelona for €4 million on a three-year deal, with Barcelona also ceding their right to buy Pepe Reina back from Villarreal. He was signed to replace Michael Reiziger, whose contract was expiring.

Belletti's first and only goal with Barcelona was the winner in the 2006 UEFA Champions League Final against Arsenal on 17 May, when he came on as a substitute for Oleguer Presas. His third season was marked by injuries, and competition from new rival Gianluca Zambrotta proved too much for him; he played very little as the campaign ended without silverware. Nonetheless, in March 2007, he extended his deal until 2009.

Chelsea
On 23 August 2007, Chelsea signed Belletti on a three-year deal for £4 million. The club had previously been trying to sign his compatriot Dani Alves, who went to Barcelona. He made his Premier League debut two days later as a 64th-minute substitute for Mikel John Obi in a 4–0 home win over  Portsmouth, a 4–0 victory. He became the starting right-back, ahead of Paulo Ferreira.

In his first season at Chelsea, Belletti scored two goals, both from long-range, the first away at Wigan Athletic in November and the second at Stamford Bridge against Tottenham Hotspur on 12 January 2008. On 21 May, in the 2008 Champions League final against Manchester United at the Luzhniki Stadium in Moscow, he came on as a substitute just before the penalty shootout, in which he scored though his team lost.

Under compatriot new manager Luiz Felipe Scolari in 2008–09, Belletti was used as a utility player, in the central midfield and defensive midfield positions. On 18 October, he from 30 yards into the top corner against Middlesbrough in a 5–0 win at the Riverside Stadium, his fourth league goal for the club. The following 17 January, he scored a late equaliser as the team came from behind to win 2–1 at home to Stoke City.

A year later, in January 2010, Belletti was linked with a move to Flamengo in his native Brazil, but the Blues rejected their offer. On 27 February, he was sent off for a professional foul on Manchester City midfielder Gareth Barry to concede a penalty in a  4–2 loss at Stamford Bridge. Belletti came on as a substitute in the final game of the 2009–10 Premier League season, where a Chelsea win ensured they won the title. A week later, he came on as a substitute for the injured Michael Ballack in the 2010 FA Cup Final against Portsmouth. He gave away a penalty with a foul on Kevin-Prince Boateng, which the Ghanaian missed as Chelsea won 1–0.

On 9 June 2010, Chelsea announced that Belletti was one of three players whose contract would not be renewed at the end of the month, alongside Joe Cole and Ballack. He made a total of 94 appearances, scoring five goals.

Fluminense
Following his release from Chelsea, he signed a two-year contract for Fluminense back in Brazil on 14 July 2010.

Struggling with several injuries and being unable to find a spot in the starting line-up, Belletti had his contract ended on 15 March 2011. He played nine matches with Fluminense, starting only three.

On 15 June 2011, Belletti signed a one-year contract with Ceará but just 12 days later, he retired due to an Achilles tendon injury.

International career
Belletti made his international debut for Brazil on 28 March 2001 in a 1–0 loss away to Ecuador in 2002 FIFA World Cup qualification. In July, he went to the 2001 Copa América in Colombia, where he scored in a 3–1 win against Paraguay, but netted an own goal in a shock defeat to last-minute invitees Honduras as the team suffered a quarter-final exit. The team bounced back to win the World Cup in Japan and South Korea, with Belletti playing the semi-final match against Turkey after replacing Kléberson for the final five minutes of the 1–0 win. Belletti's international career was limited by sharing his position with the team's captain, Cafú.

Belletti played at the 2003 FIFA Confederations Cup but missed the 2005 edition, for which Cafú was absent. Suffering from a right Achilles tendon injury, his place was taken by Cicinho and Maicon, who dominated the position in the years to come by.

Coaching career
On 4 February 2021, Belletti was named assistant at his first club Cruzeiro, after previously working in the club's International Business section. On 31 July, he was in charge of the club's first team trainings after the departure of Mozart, but returned to previous duties on 3 August after the appointment of Vanderlei Luxemburgo.

Career statistics

Club

Notes

International

Score and result list Brazil's goal tally first, score column indicates score after Belletti goal.

Honours
São Paulo
Campeonato Paulista: 1998, 2000

Villarreal
UEFA Intertoto Cup: 2003

Barcelona
La Liga: 2004–05, 2005–06
Supercopa de España: 2005, 2006
UEFA Champions League: 2005–06

Chelsea
Premier League: 2009–10
FA Cup: 2008–09, 2009–10
FA Community Shield: 2009
UEFA Champions League runner-up: 2007–08

Fluminense
Campeonato Brasileiro Série A: 2010

Brazil
FIFA World Cup: 2002

References

External links

1976 births
Living people
People from Cascavel
Brazilian footballers
Brazilian people of Italian descent
Brazil international footballers
Expatriate footballers in England
Association football fullbacks
Cruzeiro Esporte Clube players
São Paulo FC players
Clube Atlético Mineiro players
Villarreal CF players
FC Barcelona players
Chelsea F.C. players
Fluminense FC players
Ceará Sporting Club players
Campeonato Brasileiro Série A players
La Liga players
Premier League players
Expatriate footballers in Spain
Brazilian expatriate footballers
2001 Copa América players
2002 FIFA World Cup players
2003 FIFA Confederations Cup players
FIFA World Cup-winning players
Brazilian expatriate sportspeople in England
Brazilian expatriate sportspeople in Spain
UEFA Champions League winning players
FA Cup Final players
Sportspeople from Paraná (state)